Malewezi is a surname. Notable people with the surname include:

Justin Malewezi (1943–2021), Malawian politician
Qabaniso Malewezi (born 1979), Malawian poet and musician, son of Justin

Bantu-language surnames